Lewis Frederick Morley  (16 June 1925 – 3 September 2013) was a photographer.

Biography
Morley was born in Hong Kong to English and Chinese parents and interned in Stanley Internment Camp during the Japanese occupation of Hong Kong between 1941 and 1945, when he was released and emigrated to the United Kingdom with his family. He studied at Twickenham Art School for three years, and spent time as a painter in Paris in the 1950s.

Perhaps best known for his photographs of Christine Keeler and Joe Orton, Morley began his career with assignments for magazines such as Tatler. He was also a successful theatre photographer for over 100 West End productions. His publicity photographs for the Beyond The Fringe revue (1961) included a study of the cast Peter Cook, Dudley Moore, Alan Bennett and Jonathan Miller which was used for the best selling LP Cover of the show.

Morley emigrated to Australia in 1971 with his wife Patricia and son Lewis, where he lived in the inner west of Sydney. He did studio and commercial work photographing architecture and food in magazines such as Belle, and worked with interior designers and stylists such as Babette Hayes, and Charmaine Solomon until his retirement in 1987. In 1989 he collaborated with photographs curator Terence Pepper in staging his first museum retrospective at London's National Portrait Gallery and subsequently donated all the images printed for the exhibition as part of a larger archive of his work. His first autobiography Black and White Lies was published in 1992.

In the mid 1990s, Morley ventured into the gallery business when he opened The Lewis Morley Photographers Showcase.  Embracing the great tradition of photographic salons, the gallery presented the work of a variety of local photographers from a range of genres.

In 1999, Lewis Morley appeared in the Contemporary Australian Photographers series. It was followed in 2003 with the release of a film about his life and an exhibition Myself and Eye at the National Portrait Gallery in Canberra.

In 2006, an extensive exhibition showcasing 50 years of Lewis Morley work was displayed at the Art Gallery of New South Wales. Titled Lewis Morley: 50 Years of Photography, the exhibition included 150 of his works covering fashion, theatre, and reportage, many of which had never been seen before.

Morley died in September 2013 aged 88. His archive was subsequently donated to the National Media Museum in Bradford, England.

References

Further reading 
 Lewis Morley: Photographer of the Sixties (1989), London: National Portrait Gallery. (Exhibition catalogue with texts by Terence Pepper and David Mellor) 
 Lewis Morley (2006) with Interview by Judy Annear and essay by Barry Humphries. Sydney: Art Gallery of New South Wales, . (Exhibition Catalogue)
 Lewis Morley (1992), Black and White Lies. Sydney: ETT. . (Autobiography)
 Lewis Morley (1998), From the series: Contemporary Photographers, Australia:4, Text by Paul Burrows. 
 Lewis Morley: I to Eye. Sydney: T&G Publishing, 2011. . (Retrospective)

External links
Obituary, Daily Telegraph, 8 September 2013
Lewis Morley profile
Photographing Christine Keeler described on the Victoria and Albert Museum website
LewisMorley.Com
Pathe Film of Morley at work
Gallery of Morley's photographs from The Guardian
Lewis Morley images in the collection of the Art Gallery NSW
Photographs by Lewis Morley in the National Portrait Gallery, London

1925 births
2013 deaths
20th-century Australian photographers
Hong Kong emigrants to the United Kingdom
English photographers
Hong Kong people of English descent
Hong Kong photographers
Theatrical photographers
Internees at Stanley Internment Camp
Recipients of the Medal of the Order of Australia
British emigrants to Australia